Ships numbered 177 include:

Surface vessels
 , a WWII U.S. Navy Shearwater-class auxiliary
 , a Cold War U.S. Navy Cimarron-class fleet oiler
 , a WWII U.S. Navy Haskell-class attack transport
 , a trans-Atlantic oceanliner requisitioned as a WWII U.S. Navy troopship
 , a Cold War Soviet minesweeper
 , a WWI U.S. Navy Wicker-class destroyer
 , a WWII U.S. Navy Cannon-class destroyer escort
 , a Japanese Maritime Self-Defense Force guided missile destroyer
 , a WWII British Royal Navy repair ship
 , a WWII Canadian minesweeper
 , a WWII U.S. Navy minesweeper
 , a WWII Canadian corvette
 , a WWII U.S. Navy tank landing ship
 , a Belgian trawler
 , a Nigerian navy patrol boat
 , an end-of-WWII U.S. Navy Tacoma-class frigate
 , a WWI U.S. Navy armed yacht

Submarines
 , a WWII Japanese Kaidar-class cruiser submarine
 , an interwar U.S. Navy Porpoise-class submarine
 , a WWII German Kriegsmarine submarine

Wikipedia disambiguation